Arriva Shires & Essex is a bus operator providing services in Bedfordshire, Buckinghamshire, Essex and Hertfordshire, with services extending to Oxfordshire and Greater London. Until 2002 its operations included Colchester. It is a subsidiary of Arriva UK Bus.

Operations are split between two registered companies, Arriva East Herts & Essex Limited and Arriva The Shires Limited.

Arriva East Herts & Essex

Arriva East Herts & Essex Limited is based in Harlow, and operate two bus garages in Harlow (Fourth Avenue) and Ware (Marsh Lane).

Arriva East Herts & Essex emerged from London Country North East (LCNE), one of the successor companies of London Country Bus Services. LCNE was broken in two. One of the successor companies, County Bus & Coach, with depots at Harlow, Hertford and Grays, was bought by its management in 1990. In 1994 County was sold to West Midlands Travel, itself bought by National Express in 1995. The Cowie Group bought County from National Express in 1996. County Bus & Coach was renamed Arriva East Herts & Essex in April 1998.

Cowie had also acquired Southend Transport and Colchester Borough Transport with its acquisition of British Bus in 1996. Both companies became part of Arriva East Herts & Essex, but in 2002 were transferred to Arriva Southern Counties together with the former County depot at Grays.

Harlow
Harlow garage was opened by London Transport on 22 May 1963 to serve Harlow New Town and also to replace Epping garage. Harlow was allocated 25 AEC Regent III RTs, 16 AEC Routemasters (to operate Green Line routes 718, 720 & 720A), seven RFs and two coach RFs. London Country North East and County Bus used the garage until The Cowie Group purchased County Bus in 1997.

This was previously an Arriva East Herts & Essex garage, but it is now part of the Tellings-Golden Miller subsidiary with buses are branded as Network Harlow. In 2015, it reverted to being part of Arriva Southern Counties. 

Routes run: 1, 2, 3, 4, 6, 8, 9, 10, 59, 86, 308, 309, 311, 508/509/510 (Stansted Airport - Harlow) and 724

As of Jan 2023, the fleet list consists of:

Ware

Ware garage replaced the Hertford depot in 1993. It runs part of route 724 along with Harlow garage.  Operation of London bus route 327 was transferred from Ware to Arriva London's Enfield garage on 3 January 2009. Ware did briefly become an Arriva The Shires garage in late 2010, before transferring back to Arriva East Herts & Essex. On 4 September 2010 routes 250 and 251 transferred from Harlow to Ware.

Routes run: 66, 242, 251, 308, 310, 324, 331, 378, 379, 380, 395, 401, 404/405, C1, M2, M3, M4 and M5. Routes 242, 331, 401 and 404/405 are due to be given up from March 2023

As of Jan 2023, the fleet list consists of:

Arriva The Shires
Arriva The Shires Limited is based in Luton and operates bus garages in Luton, High Wycombe, Aylesbury, Stevenage, Hitchin and Hemel Hempstead.

Arriva the Shires evolved from the purchase of the Luton, Aylesbury and Hitchin depots of United Counties by Luton & District Transport in a management buy-out in 1987. Depots at Watford, High Wycombe, Hemel Hempstead, Amersham and Slough were acquired with London Country North West in 1990, although Amersham has since closed and Slough was later sold to Bee Line. LDT was bought in 1994 by British Bus, itself bought in 1996 by The Cowie Group. LDT's was renamed Arriva the Shires in April 1998.

Aylesbury
Aylesbury depot was a depot of United Counties acquired by LDT in 1987. Later in 1987 LDT also acquired the long-established Aylesbury independent company, Red Rover.

Aylesbury predominantly operates long distance services, such as the 150 to Milton Keynes, 300 to High Wycombe, 500 to Watford and 280/X8 to Oxford. They previously ran a number of local services in the town, but only one of these (route 9) remains. In Oct 2022, 500 was cut back to Hemel Hempstead. 

Routes run: 9/9A/9C, 150, 250, Sapphire 280 (Aylesbury - Oxford), 300, 500 and X8

Hemel Hempstead
Hemel Hempstead was a depot of London Country Bus Services (North West) (one of the companies into which London Country Bus Services was divided in 1986), acquired by Luton & District Transport in 1988. 

Hemel Hempstead runs a small number of local routes in the town as well as the 300/302 to St Albans and Welwyn Garden City, 320 to Rickmansworth and some diagrams on route 500 to Aylesbury and Watford. In 2016, Hemel Hempstead took over operation of Watford local services 8 and 10. In March 2022, Services 300 and 320 were withdrawn with 320 being partially replaced by new route 20. In Oct 2022, the 500 was cut back to Hemel and replaced by a renumbered and extended 8 (508). 

Routes run: 2, 3/4, 9, 10/20, 302, 335/336, 508, 821 and 824

High Wycombe

High Wycombe was another depot of London Country Bus Services (North West), acquired by LDT in 1988.

In 2000 Arriva also bought the High Wycombe depot of the Go-Ahead Group's Oxford Bus Company (which had bought it from the Bee Line in 1994).
 
In 2005 High Wycombe garage moved to a new purpose built depot following the closure of the old bus station in the town, where the previous garage was. High Wycombe operate a number of services both locally and further afield, reaching Amersham on the 1A and Reading on the 800/850. In 2022, Arriva transferred all 1A services to Carousel Buses in return for a number of High Wycombe town services. This would later be complemented by the transfer of Service 41 to Carousel Buses in Jan 2023. 

Routes run: 30, 31/31A, 32/32A, 33/33A, 35/36/36B/36S/37, 37A, 48 and 80X/800/850.

Luton

Luton depot is purpose-built and is at 487 Dunstable Road. It replaced the previous depot at Castle Street. It also houses the Head Office for Arriva The Shires & Essex as well as the UK bus team.

The majority of Luton's routes are within the Luton and Dunstable boundary, including four on the Luton-Dunstable Busway. Busway routes F70 and F77 reach out as far as Milton Keynes and the 321 operates to Watford, the latter being taken over from Garston (Watford) in 2016.

Luton operates Green Line Coaches routes 755 and 757 and previously had an outstation at Stansted Airport which operated the EB2 an easyBus contract. It also operated Green Line 748, 758, 759 and 768 between late 2019 and their withdrawal in December 2021. 

Routes ran: 1/4, 12/802/812, 13, 14, 23, 24/25, 27, 28/28B, 31, 32, 34/35, 321, 755/757, 800/810/838, 801, 817, 823, 828/829, 835, Busway routes A, F70, F77 and Z, D1 and LB32.

Hitchin/Stevenage

The Hitchin depot was a depot of United Counties acquired by LDT in 1987.

Hitchin services have been worked from Stevenage garage since January 2007 following the closure of the old former United Counties garage in Fishponds Road. Services around the Hitchin area have been reduced, and many are operated by other contractors including Centrebus.

When London Country Bus Services was broken up in 1986, the Stevenage depot passed to London Country North East, sold in 1988 to AJS Group who established the Sovereign brand. Most of the operation was sold in 1990 to Luton & District Transport, and therefore became part of Arriva in 1996. In 1996 Arriva took over several vehicles and routes from Sovereign, by then owned by the Blazefield Group, in exchange for the London Green Line route 797. In 2004 Arriva acquired the last remaining Sovereign operation. Blazefield had already sold its London operations to Transdev London and its St Albans depot and routes to Centrebus.

Arriva currently have two depots in the town; Babbage Road (ex Sovereign) and Bessemer Road. The site at Norton Green closed during August 2021 for redevelopment, with vehicles temporarily moving to a new site at Bessemer Road. Eventually all buses operating from Stevenage will be based at an expanded Babbage Road site.

As well as operating a number of local services, Stevenage also runs to Letchworth on route 55, Luton on the 100/101, St Albans on route 301 and the 97/98 between Hitchin and Stotfold/Baldock.

Milton Keynes

In February 2006 Arriva bought the operations of MK Metro for £5.6 million, and operational control transferred to The Shires & Essex. The purchase was subsequently considered by the Office of Fair Trading for possible referral to the Competition Commission, but it decided not to. Vehicles and publicity for the Milton Keynes operation continued to use the MK Metro name until April 2010, when they were rebranded as Arriva Milton Keynes, temporarily using the brand name MK Star. The change of name coincided with a number of controversial service changes. Many services were improved in frequency as part of the rebranding but others were reduced or withdrawn and some journey times were increased.

There are various local services operated, many of which serve Bletchley. In 2021, the depot was awarded the contract to operate routes 33/33A to Northampton and also have responsibility for route X60 to Aylesbury.

Waltham Abbey
Arriva The Shires previously operated 2 routes in the Waltham Abbey area:
 251, Upshire to Hammond Street
 250, Debden Broadway to Waltham Cross

Route 250 remained in competition with route 255 operated by Harlow-based Roadrunner buses. Earlier in 2013 Arriva withdrew route 250 service to provide a stronger service on the 251 and to expand onto the 310 route from Waltham Cross to Ware. Many of the buses used on the 250 service can now be seen on the 251 service operating from Upshire to Hammond Street more frequently.

Former Garages

Watford (Garston)

As of May 2015, Watford garage operated London routes 142, 258, 268, 288, 303, 305, 340, 631, 642, H2, H3, H18 and H19. It also operated LSP route 8, and school routes. As part of a decision to consolidate all of Arriva's Transport for London routes, Watford garage was transferred to Arriva London on 1 January 2016. Due to high running costs, Watford depot closed in 2018, with the routes being transferred to Hemel Hempstead. On Sunday 8 April 2018, the Amersham & District Motorbus Society held its annual running day in honour of the depot, with the theme being 'Farewell to Garston garage'. In 2019, the site was sold to Fairview New Homes with the vision to convert it into 165 residential houses.

History
Watford was a depot of London Country Bus Services (North West) (one of the companies into which London Country Bus Services was divided in 1986), acquired by Luton & District Transport in 1990.

References

External links

Shires and Essex
Transport in the Borough of Brentwood
Transport in the City of Chelmsford
Transport in Epping Forest District
Transport in Harlow
Transport in Hertfordshire
1998 establishments in England